Pimocagna (also, Pinioocagna) is a former  Tongva-Gabrieleño Native American settlement in Los Angeles County, California. It was located at the Andrés Ybarra "Ybarra Ranch" in the Los Angeles area, who also owned the Rancho Las Encinitas.

See also
Category: Tongva populated places
Tongva language
California mission clash of cultures
Ranchos in California

References

Former settlements in Los Angeles County, California
Former Native American populated places in California
Former populated places in California
Tongva populated places